Bat-Dor was an Israeli dance company based in Tel Aviv, Israel, co-founded by Baroness Bethsabée de Rothschild (Batsheva) and dancer Jeannette Ordman.

Company
Bat Dor made its debut in 1968 with Ordman as its leading dancer. 

The company had a large repertoire of modern works. Among the international choreographers who worked with Bat Dor are Antony Tudor, Rudy van Dantzig, Lar Lubovitch, Alvin Ailey, Judith Jamison, Luciano Mattia Cannito, Hans van Manen, Martha Graham, Jiri Killian and Israelis Domy Reiter-Soffer, Igal Perry and Ido Tadmor. 

The company existed until July 2006.

See also
Culture of Israel
Jewish dance

References

External links
 Israeli Ministry Of Foreign Affairs.

Dance companies in Israel
Modern dance companies
Organizations established in 1969